Richard L. Morrill (born June 4, 1939) has served as president of several American colleges and universities.  He currently holds the positions of Chancellor and Distinguished University Professor of Ethics and Democratic Values at the University of Richmond.

Education
Morrill received his Bachelor of Arts degree in History from Brown University in 1961 and his Bachelor of Divinity degree in Religious Thought from Yale University in 1964. He received his Ph.D. in Religion from Duke University in 1968.

Academic appointments
In his early career, Morrill held faculty positions at Wells College, Chatham College, and Pennsylvania State University.  In 1979, he was named president of Salem College in Winston-Salem, North Carolina.  From 1982 until 1988, Morrill was president of Centre College.  He then served as President of the University of Richmond from 1988 until 1998.  Upon taking office as president of the university, he delivered an inaugural address entitled "The Absorbing Errand."

External links
 History of the University of Richmond: People: Dr. Richard L. Morrill
 Centre College Presidents - Richard L. Morrill

1939 births
Living people
University of Richmond faculty
Presidents of the University of Richmond
People from Massachusetts
Presidents of Centre College
Brown University alumni
Yale University alumni
Duke University alumni